First Nations in Saskatchewan constitute many Native Canadian band governments.  First Nations ethnicities in the province include the Cree, Assiniboine, Saulteaux, Lakota, Dene and Dakota. Historically, the Atsina and Blackfoot could also be found at various times.

"In 1992, the federal and provincial governments signed a historic land claim agreement with Saskatchewan First Nations. Under the Agreement, the First Nations received money to buy land on the open market. As a result, about 761,000 acres have been turned into reserve land and many First Nations continue to invest their settlement dollars in urban areas."

List of band governments

Treaty 4

Treaty 5

Treaty 6

Treaty 8

Treaty 10

See also

Politics of Saskatchewan

References

 
First Nations